Marelissa Him Betancourt (born 2 July 1988, in Ciudad de Panamá, Panamá) is a Panamanian model and beauty pageant contestant, winner of the Miss Earth Panamá 2011 title.

Early life
Marelissa Him Betancourt was born on July 2, 1988 in Panama city, Panama. Daughter of Miriam Betancourt and Gustavo Him, has a younger brother named Jorge Luis Him. During her childhood years she studied in The Oxford School where she discovered her passion for arts&crafts by participating in different art contests held in the school.

When she turned 12, she started modeling for Physical Model Agency, as the years went by she became one of the most out standing models in Panama.

Modeling career:
 2005-2007: ESTAMPA, 2 Magazine covers (Ellas teen, teen lifestyle)
 2008: Charlie's Place and 2 "Ellas Magazine" Covers and became the face of Felix B. Maduro. Also joined a non-profit organization named ANCON to help protect the environment and nature.
 2009: Felix B. Maduro and started participating in Fashion Week Panama (also called Dias de Moda Panama).
 2010: Started modeling for one of Panama's best designers Greta Bayo, posed for BLANK Magazine, Selecta Magazine, 2 Ellas" covers and in the Miss Panama 2010 beauty pageant she became a finalist entering the top 10. Right after the Miss Panama Pageant was held, she received a call from Ana Gabriela Delgado (Old Fashion Icon) to become the next TV hostess for her TV fashion show "Ellas y tu".
 2011: While still working at "Ellas y tu", Marelissa was recently crowned as Miss Earth Panama 2011 because of her passion for the conservation and protection of our planet earth.

Señorita Panamá 2010
Him is 5 ft 7 in (1.67 m) tall, and competed in the national beauty pageant Señorita Panamá 2010, where she unplace contest winner for Anyolí Ábrego who participate in the Miss Universe 2010 (who in turn failed to enter the semi-finals of Miss Universe 2010).

Miss Earth 2011
She represented Panamá in the Miss Earth 2011 pageant.

Reina Hispanoamericana 2011
She represented Panamá in the Reina Hispanoamericana 2011 pageant, held on October 27, 2011 in Santa Cruz, Bolivia.

See also
 Keity Mendieta
 Señorita Panamá 2010

References

External links
 Miss Panamá

1988 births
Living people
Miss Earth 2011 contestants
Panamanian beauty pageant winners
Panamanian female models
Señorita Panamá